"Ffun" is a hit song written by Michael Cooper, produced by Skip Scarborough, and performed by R&B/funk band Con Funk Shun.

Background
Released from their Secrets album, it spent 2 weeks at number one on the R&B singles chart the first two weeks in January 1978.  It also crossed over to the pop charts, peaking at number 23 on the Billboard Hot 100.

Chart performance

References

1977 songs
1977 singles
Con Funk Shun songs
Mercury Records singles